Mark Knight (born 1962) is an Australian cartoonist. He is currently the editorial cartoonist for the Herald Sun, a daily tabloid newspaper in Melbourne. Knight was also the last editorial cartoonist for one of the Herald Sun's joint predecessor newspapers, the afternoon broadsheet The Herald.

Childhood
Born in Marrickville, Sydney, Knight grew up in Lakemba, attended Wiley Park Primary School and then Narwee Boys' High School. He showed an early interest in drawing which was encouraged by his artistic father. Knight's first cartoons were of his family and their idiosyncrasies, drawn at family gatherings. When he was six years old, Knight's father bought him Paul Rigby's cartoon annual of 1967; Rigby's work influence his artwork for many years. He created scrapbooks of Rigby's cartoons cut from The Daily Telegraph, and studied and imitated them while developing his cartooning style.

Knight started a cadetship in 1980 in the Fairfax art department, filling in the black squares in the crossword grids. He went to East Sydney Technical College and studied life drawing, painting, drawing and etching.

Career
Knight worked as an editorial cartoonist for The Herald, and later for the Herald Sun after The Herald and The Sun were united in 1990.

In 1999 Knight, alongside Bill Leak and other male political cartoonists, were criticised by the Labor Party's deputy leader, Jenny Macklin, who argued that cartoons such as those by Knight and Leak showing Meg Lees in sexual relations with John Howard were demeaning to women politicians.

Knight created the children's character "Leuk the Duck" (derived from leukemia), a mascot for the Challenge cancer foundation which has subsequently been used in the organisation's educational material.

Knight is also well-known for his Australian rules football imagery. After cartoonist William Ellis Green ("WEG") died in 2008, Knight took over his role as the Herald Sun'''s creator of Australian Football League (AFL) premiership posters and, because of this, has made media appearances on AFL shows, including designing alternate posters. For example, in 2017 on The Front Bar ahead of that year's grand final between Richmond and Adelaide, he unveiled a poster showing co-host and Richmond fan Mick Molloy wearing a Tiger onesie.

In September 2018, after tennis player Serena Williams was penalized for code violations during the 2018 US Open, Knight created a cartoon depicting Williams with exaggerated, masculine features and red lips reminiscent of racist caricatures of the 19th and 20th century. Knight was also criticized because Williams' opponent in the match was Naomi Osaka, a Japanese-Haitian, but critics asserted that Knight depicted Osaka instead as a blonde white woman. Video and photos from the 2018 US Open women's final show that Osaka's naturally dark hair was in fact dyed blonde at that time. Knight and the Herald Sun defended the caricature as depicting Williams' behaviour and having nothing to do with race, and Knight said he knew nothing of the Jim Crow period or drawings. A day later, the Herald Sun reprinted the caricature on the front page with the headline "Welcome to PC World". After receiving several complaints, the Australian Press Council ruled in February 2019 that the cartoon did not breach its media standards.

Awards
Knight won a Quill Award for Best Cartoon in 2001 from the Melbourne Press Club. In 2005, he won a Gold Quill Award from the Melbourne Press Club for the best cartoon of the year.

He was named The Age'' Cartoonist of the Year at the 22nd annual Stan Cross Awards ceremony on 4 November 2007. His other accolades include awards in the categories Single Gag (2003) and Editorial (1995, 2006).

In 2004, Knight was also presented with a Walkley Award for his cartoon named "Benefits of a Bedtime Story".

In 2003, he received an award as part of the Australian Comedy Awards in the visual category for Outstanding Cartoonist as well as another Walkley Award.

References

1962 births
Living people
Australian editorial cartoonists
Cartoonists from Melbourne
National Art School alumni
Artists from Sydney